Jason Young (born 28 June 1986) is an English mixed martial artist. He currently trains at Team Titan and American Top Team.

Early life
Born in Lewisham, England, Young started fighting at age 17 to stay out of trouble in the streets. Before he started fighting professionally, Young worked as a plasterer.

Mixed martial arts career

Early career
Young became a professional fighter in 2006 and fought the first five fights of his career in Cage Rage - Contenders, building up a record of 4-1. He then moved on to fight three fights in Ultimate Challenge MMA, winning their Lightweight title and accomplishing a notable win over Abdul Mohamed by way of majority decision. Young then fought fellow current UFC fighter, and yet unbeaten, Paul Sass, in Olympian MMA Championship, tapping out to a heel hook at 2:01 of the first round.

Ultimate Fighting Championship
Young signed with the UFC as a late replacement for Rani Yahya to fight Dustin Poirier at UFC 131 on 11 June 2011. Young lost the fight via unanimous decision.

Young next faced Michihiro Omigawa on 5 November 2011 at UFC 138 and lost via unanimous decision.

Young was expected to face Akira Corassani at UFC on Fuel TV 2. However, Corassani was forced out of the bout with an injury and replaced by Eric Wisely. He won the fight via unanimous decision, his first UFC victory.

Young faced Robbie Peralta on 29 September 2012 at UFC on Fuel TV 5. During the very first round, Peralta dropped Young with a vicious right hand followed by some devastating ground and pound which knocked Young out cold, giving Young his first KO loss. After the loss, Young was released from the promotion.

Championships and Achievements
 UCMMA K1 Champion

Mixed martial arts record

|-
| Loss
| align=center| 9–6
| Robbie Peralta
| KO (punches)
| UFC on Fuel TV: Struve vs. Miocic
| 
| align=center| 1
| align=center| 0:23
| Nottingham, England
| 
|-
| Win
| align=center| 9–5
| Eric Wisely
| Decision (unanimous)
| UFC on Fuel TV: Gustafsson vs. Silva
| 
| align=center| 3
| align=center| 5:00
| Stockholm, Sweden
| 
|-
| Loss
| align=center| 8–5
| Michihiro Omigawa
| Decision (unanimous)
| UFC 138
| 
| align=center| 3
| align=center| 5:00
| Birmingham, England
| 
|-
| Loss
| align=center| 8–4
| Dustin Poirier
| Decision (unanimous)
| UFC 131
| 
| align=center| 3
| align=center| 5:00
| Vancouver, British Columbia, Canada
| 
|-
| Win
| align=center| 8–3
| Jorge Britto
| Decision (unanimous)
| MMA 1: The Reckoning
| 
| align=center| 3
| align=center| 5:00
| Orillia, Ontario, Canada
| The Score Fighting Series Fight of the Year 2011
|-
| Win
| align=center| 7–3
| Sergej Grecicho
| Decision (unanimous)
| Cage Warriors 38: Young Guns
| 
| align=center| 3
| align=center| 5:00
| North London, England
| 
|-
| Loss
| align=center| 6–3
| Paul Sass
| Submission (heel hook)
| OMMAC 4: Victorious
| 
| align=center| 1
| align=center| 2:01
| Liverpool, England
| 
|-
| Win
| align=center| 6–2
| Abdul Mohamed
| Decision (majority)
| UCMMA 8: Dynamite
| 
| align=center| 3
| align=center| 5:00
| London, England
| 
|-
| Win
| align=center| 5–2
| Jordan Miller
| TKO (corner stoppage)
| UCMMA 3: Unstoppable
| 
| align=center| 2
| align=center| 5:00
| London, England
| 
|-
| Loss
| align=center| 4–2
| Tim Radcliffe
| Submission (rear-naked choke)
| UCMMA 1: Bad Breed
| 
| align=center| 1
| align=center| 3:03
| London, England
| 
|-
| Win
| align=center| 4–1
| Francis Heagney
| Decision (unanimous)
| Cage Rage 27
| 
| align=center| 3
| align=center| 5:00
| London, England
| 
|-
| Win
| align=center| 3–1
| Jody Cottham
| TKO (punches)
| Cage Rage Contenders 9
| 
| align=center| 1
| align=center| 3:02
| United Kingdom
| 
|-
| Win
| align=center| 2–1
| Michael King
| TKO (punches)
| Cage Rage Contenders 7
| 
| align=center| 2
| align=center| 0:48
| London, England
| 
|-
| Loss
| align=center| 1–1
| Steven Elliot
| Submission (armbar)
| Cage Rage Contenders 3
| 
| align=center| 1
| align=center| 3:59
| London, England
| 
|-
| Win
| align=center| 1–0
| Paul Phipps
| Submission (punches)
| Cage Rage Contenders 2
| 
| align=center| 1
| align=center| 0:26
| South London, England
|

See also
List of current UFC fighters
List of male mixed martial artists

References

External links
Official UFC Profile
https://twitter.com/shotgun_young

 Jason Young - UFC Fans

1986 births
Living people
English male mixed martial artists
Featherweight mixed martial artists
Sportspeople from London
Ultimate Fighting Championship male fighters